Rabbi Avraham Hamra (1943 - 2021) was a Syrian-Israeli rabbi.

Hamra served as the last chief rabbi of Damascus from 1976 until he immigrated to Israel along with most of the country's remaining Jews in October 1994 when then Syrian President Hafez al-Assad allowed the last Syrian Jews to leave. In addition to serving and leading the Syrian community in Holon, Israel, the rabbi frequently visited the Jewish Syrian community in New York.

He also served on the Presidium Council of the Alliance of Rabbis in Islamic States. 

He died in May 2021 in Israel, at the age of 78.

References 

1943 births
2021 deaths
Syrian rabbis
Syrian emigrants to Israel
Israeli people of Syrian-Jewish descent
Israeli rabbis
People from Damascus
Jews and Judaism in Damascus